Clarence E. Booth (September 4, 1919 – April 23, 1974) is a former professional American football offensive tackle in the National Football League (NFL). He was drafted in the 18th round (164th overall) of the 1943 NFL Draft after playing college football at Southern Methodist University.

Booth played in the league for two seasons with the Chicago Cardinals and "Card-Pitt," a team that was the result of a temporary merger between the Chicago Cardinals and the Pittsburgh Steelers, in 1943 and 1944. The reason for the team merger was a league-wide shortage of manning due to World War II. 

1919 births
1974 deaths
People from Childress, Texas
Players of American football from Texas
American football offensive tackles
American football defensive tackles
Chicago Cardinals players
Card-Pitt players
SMU Mustangs football players